Azhagu ( Beauty) is a 2017 Indian Tamil-language soap opera starring Shruthi Raj, VJ Sangeetha, Revathi and Thalaivasal Vijay. The show premiered on 20 November 2017 and apparently ended on 3 April 2020 due to COVID-19 pandemic. The show was produced by Vision Time India Pvt Ltd on Sun TV.

Synopsis

Season-1
The story is about the nuances of love between husband Palaniswamy and his wife Azhagu, even though they have been married for decades, and have successful and robust individual personas.

Azhagu is the one who finds amicable solutions to all family problems and issues while struggling to help her five children Ravi, Aishwarya, Mahesh, Thiruna and Kavya survive peacefully.

Season-2
Ravi's wife Sudha becomes an ideal daughter in law of the family while Mahesh's wife Poorna hatches various plots against the family. Soon, it is revealed that Poorna and Sudha are Sakundala's long lost daughters. Despite, Poorna turns eviler, and she creates various problems.

Cast

Main
 Revathi as Azhagammai "Azhagu" Palaniswamy: Palaniswamy's wife
Thalaivasal Vijay as Palaniswamy: Azhagammai's husband
 VJ Sangeetha as Poorna Mahesh: Mahesh's wife (Main Antagonist)
Shruthi Raj as Sudha Ravi: Ravi's wife
Mithra Kurian as Aishwarya: Azhagammai's daughter

Supporting
 Manikanda Rajesh as Maheshkumar "Mahesh" Palaniswamy: Azhagu and Palani's second son
 Lokesh Bhaskaran/Vibhu Raman as  Ravikumar "Ravi" Palaniswamy: Azhagu and Palani's elder son
 Gayatri Jayaraman as Sakuntala Devi Aravind: Sudha, Poorna and Madhan's mother
 Niranjan/Avinash Ashok as Thirunavukkarasu Palaniswamy: Azhagu and Palani's younger son
 Farina Azad/Akshitha Bopaiah/Vaishnavi Arulmozhi as Nivedhitha Thirunavukkarasu aka Nivi: Thiruna's wife
 Sahana Sheddy as Kavya Madhan: Azhagu and Palani's youngest daughter
 Vigneshwaran as Madhankumar "Madhan" Aravind: Kavya's husband
 Muralidhar Raj as Aravind: Sudha, Poorna and Madhan's father
 Gayathri Raj as Malliga 
 Usha Elizabeth as Kaaliyamma
 Sai Gopi as Dharmalingam
 Joker Tulasi as Tulasi: Sakunthala Devi's assistant
 Sonu Satheesh Kumar as Priya Sundaram: Archana's elder sister
 Rajesh as Sundaralingam "Sundaram": Archana and Priya's father
 Veena Venkatesh as Maheshwari Sundaram: Archana and Priya's mother
 Mithra Kurian/Nithya Das/Niranjani Ashok as Aishwarya "Aishu" Ganesh: Azhagu and Palani's eldest daughter
 Jayaraman Mohan as Ganeshkumar "Ganesh" Sethuraman: Aishu's husband
 Ramya Ramakrishna as Rathi Venkat: Nivi's sister
 Fawaz Zayani as Venkatakrishnan "Venkat": Nivi's uncle
 Sudha as Rangamma: Sudha's adoptive mother
 Shree Ashwini as Inspector Vijayalakshmi
 Ashwin as Surender: Sudha's first husband (died in serial)
 Aishwariyaa Bhaskaran as Vasantha: Palani's younger sister; Poorna's adoptive mother
 Vasu Vikram as Manimaran: Azhagu's elder brother
 Rajyalakshmi as Devi Manimaran: Manimaran's wife
 Navindhar as Mahendran Manimaran: Manimaran's son
 Bhagyalakshmi  as Vijaya 
 Shanthi Williams as Aravind and Shailaja's mother 
 Sai Madhavi as Shailaja: Aravind's sister
 Divya as Anitha: Ganesh's former lover
 Kousalya Senthamarai as Atthaiyamma: Anitha's grandmother
 Poovilangu Mohan as Sethuraman: Ganesh, Sathya and Manisha's father
 Naresh Eswar as Sathyamurthy a.k.a. Sathya Sethuraman: Ganesh's younger brother
 VJ Mounika as Manisha Sethuraman: Ganesh's younger sister
 Archana Harish as Supraja
 Rajesh as Naveen: Aishwarya's friend 
 Swathi Reddy as Swathy: Poorna's friend
 Arunkumar Padmanabhan as Bhaskar: Surendar's younger brother
 Uma Rani as Sornam:Surendar and Bhaskar's mother
 Aiswarya Devi as Archana Sundaram: Thiruna's ex-wife
 Prem as Krishna Kumar
 Cumbum Meena Sellamuthu as Alamelu 
 Baboos as Thandavam  
 B. Kannan as Kannan: Sethuraman's elder brother
 Gopalakrishnan Krishnamoorthy as Gopal: Sethuraman's younger brother

Guests
 S. P. Balasubrahmanyam as himself in episodes 3 and 4
 Srithika Saneesh as Vidhya in episodes 587 and 588
 Arnav as Ashok in episodes 587 and 588
 Priyanka Kumar as Iniya in episodes 629 and 630
 Sateesh Kumar as Vasudevan in episodes 629 and 630

Production

Casting
Revathi was cast as the lead Azhagu who making her comeback after 10 years. It is the second serial for the male lead Thalaivasal Vijay after 27 years. Shruthi Raj and V J Sangeeta were cast as the next leads. Aishwarya makes a TV serial comeback after 3 years sabbatical.

In October 2019, Sahana Sheddy playing Kavya quit the series stating less screen space for her role. However, within few days, she rejoined the series after the production team convinced her. In November 2019, Vaishnavi Arulmozhi replaced Akshitha Bopaiah as Nivedita. In the same month, Revathi returned to the series after 2 months break after her film shootings.

Development
On 1 April 2018, a special celebration sequence of Azhagu and Palanisamy getting married took place with the invitation of their friends and public.

The production and shooting of all Indian television series and films were halted, due to COVID-19 pandemic in India, on 19 March 2020 and were supposed to resume after 31 March 2020. However, due to nationwide lockdown in the country imposed from 25 March 2020, it could not resume and the last new episode was broadcast on 3 April 2020. After about three months, the shooting resumed after being granted permission in early June 2020 and some sequences were shot with some cast including Urvashi as a new addition. However, Tamil Nadu Government announced full lockdown from 19 June 2020 to 30 June 2020 for Chennai and its surrounding three districts. Due to it the production and filming was also once again halted. In July 2020, Sun TV abruptly confirmed the series not returning as many of the cast members including Revathi and Sruthi Raj were sceptical to arrive to shoot owing the pandemic.

References

External links 
 Official Website 

Sun TV original programming
2010s Tamil-language television series
2017 Tamil-language television series debuts
Tamil-language television shows